Richard T. Morris is an American songwriter and record producer, best known for his work with Motown Records in the 1960s.

Career
In early 1960 Morris, Janie Bradford and Robert Bateman heard The Primettes audition for Motown Records. Label owner Berry Gordy Jr. declined to sign the group at that time, and Morris approached them with an offer to record them on another label. He wrote and produced their first single "Tears of Sorrow" on Lu-Pine Records. The Primettes signed to Motown in 1961 and became The Supremes, Motown's most commercially successful act.

Morris produced and wrote for acts including Edwin Starr, and Martha & the Vandellas, sometimes collaborating with songwriter Sylvia Moy. His songs were also recorded by The Originals, Smokey Robinson & the Miracles, The Marvelettes, Stevie Wonder and others.

In 1995, Morris sued Berry Gordy Jr. and Motown for unpaid royalties.

Selective discography

Singles

Albums

References

Date of birth unknown
American male songwriters
American record producers